Latin word order is relatively free. The subject, object, and verb can come in any order, and an adjective can go before or after its noun, as can a genitive such as  "of the enemy". A common feature of Latin is hyperbaton, in which a phrase is split up by other words:  "it is Sextus Tarquinius".

A complicating factor in Latin word order is that there are variations in the style of different authors and between different genres of writing. In Caesar's historical writing, the verb is much likelier to come at the end of the sentence than in Cicero's philosophy. The word order of poetry is even freer than in prose, and examples of interleaved word order (double hyperbaton) are common.

In terms of word order typology, Latin is classified by some scholars as basically an SOV (subject-object-verb) language, with preposition-noun, noun-genitive, and adjective-noun (but also noun-adjective) order. Other scholars, however, argue that the word order of Latin is so variable that it is impossible to establish one order as more basic than another.

Although the order of words in Latin is comparatively free, it is not arbitrary. Frequently, different orders indicate different nuances of meaning and emphasis. As Devine and Stephens, the authors of Latin Word Order, put it: "Word order is not a subject which anyone reading Latin can afford to ignore. . . . Reading a paragraph of Latin without attention to word order entails losing access to a whole dimension of meaning."

Influence on meaning
Studying word order in Latin helps the reader to understand the author's meaning more clearly. For example, when a verb is placed at the beginning of a sentence, it sometimes indicates a sudden action: so  means not just "Trimalchio clapped his hands" but "Trimalchio suddenly clapped his hands". In another sentence, the initial verb functions as a topic:  does not mean merely "Corellius Rufus has died" but rather "The person who has died is Corellius Rufus." In other examples, the initial verb is emphatic:  "with my own eyes, I saw the forum".

The placement of adjectives also affects the emphasis. So the phrase , with the possessive before the noun, in the introduction to Livy's history means not "my fame" but "my own fame," contrasting with other people's fame. In the sentence  from Caesar, with the number at the end of the sentence and separated from its noun, does not mean only "five ships were burnt" but "no fewer than five ships were burnt."

The use of hyperbaton (separation of words that normally go together) is also common in Latin. Thus, Caesar's , with  "these" separated from  "flood waters", means not "These floods remained for several days" but "This time, the flood waters (unlike the previous ones) remained for several days."

Theoretical approaches
In the past 100 years, especially since the advent of computerised texts, Latin word order has been extensively studied with a view to elucidating the principles on which it is based. Two major recent works on Latin word order, based on different approaches, are those of Devine and Stephens (2006) and Olga Spevak (2010).

It is generally agreed that pragmatic factors such as topic and focus, contrast, emphasis, and heaviness play a major role in Latin word order. The topic (what is being talked about) is often at the beginning of the sentence, with the focus (what is said about the topic) being at the end or in the penultimate position.

Other factors that play a role in word order are semantic (for example, adjectives of size usually precede the noun, and those of material more often follow it). In some Latin authors, consideration of such matters as euphony, assonance, and rhythm is also important.

One major area of disagreement is how far syntax plays a role in word order. According to Devine and Stephens (2006), Latin has a basic neutral word order, which they state is as follows:

Subject – Direct Object – Indirect Object / Oblique Argument – Adjunct – Goal or Source – Non-Referential Direct Object – Verb

A "non-referential object" goes closely with the verb and makes a phrase with it like  in the phrase  "to make an attack".

Following the theories of generative grammar, Devine and Stephens assume that deviations from that basic unmarked order are made to put emphasis on different elements. They use the term "scrambling" if constituents come in a different order from the basic one, and they assume that scrambling occurs when an element is moved leftwards, towards the beginning of the sentence. Leftwards movement is called "raising".

Olga Spevak (2010), on the other hand, basing her work on theories of functional grammar, rejects that approach. She considers that there are so many deviations from the so-called neutral order between authors and even in the works of the same author that it is not possible to discover what the neutral order must be. Therefore, an approach insisting on a basic unmarked order "does not really help a Latinist to better understand Latin constituent order." She stresses that according to the principles of functional grammar, as outlined by the Dutch linguist Simon Dik, words take their positions in a sentence according to a certain template, not by being moved from elsewhere.

Harm Pinkster (1990a) also favours a pragmatic approach and writes: "there is no reason for assuming a SOV order in Classical Latin, nor is there one for assuming a SVO order by AD 400".

However, not all scholars are ready to dismiss syntactic factors entirely. J.G.F. Powell, in his review of Spevak's book, commented that "nobody has yet succeeded in unifying the insights of all the different scholarly approaches to the fascinating and peculiar problem of Latin word order". In his view, an approach that combines the various schools of thought on Latin word order "may succeed in finding a more satisfactory solution".

Topic and focus
Several recent books, such as those of Panhuis and Spevak, have analysed Latin sentences from a pragmatic point of view. Syntactic approaches traditionally analyse a sentence into Subject and Predicate, but a pragmatic analysis considers a sentence from the point of view of Topic and Focus (or Theme and Rheme, as Panhuis (1982) puts it). This type of approach was also proposed by Sturtevant (1909), who referred to the topic as the "psychological subject".

As with Subject, Object and Verb, Topic and Focus can be arranged in different ways in a sentence.

Topic

Types of topic
The topic is the thing or person that is being talked about in the sentence. Spevak (2010) distinguishes various kinds of topic: discourse topic, sentence topic, sub-topic, future topic, theme, and so on. A sentence topic is one that picks up the immediately preceding context (e.g.  below) and has precedence over the discourse topic ( below):

"To this Caesar replied..."

A topic will often take precedence over a conjunction, and the following word order where the topic (in this case the grammatical subject) precedes  "when" is fairly common:

"As for Tubero, when he reached Africa, he found Attius Varus in the province with military command."

Topicless sentences
Not every sentence has a topic, but some present information which is entirely new. Pinkster gives the following as an example:
.
"There were two roads in all."

Such sentences are sometimes called "presentative sentences" and often start with a verb.

Focus
The focus is the new information, i.e. the message which is being conveyed to the listener.

Final focus
Often in Latin the topic comes first, and then the focus. For example, in the sentence below, the topic is "in the bathhouse", which has been previously mentioned, and the sub-topic is the hot-room (since it can be assumed that all bath-houses have a hot room); the new information is that Cicero has moved the hot room, and the place to which he has moved it:

"In the bath-house the hot room I have moved into the other corner of the changing-room."

Similarly, in the following example, the new information is the sumptuousness of the funerals in question:

.
"Their funerals are magnificent and expensive."

In the following example, where the adverb  "quickly" is placed early in the sentence, the main information is the action "took up arms"; the speed is subsidiary information (Devine and Stephens use the terms "nuclear focus" and "weak focus" for this):

.
"Our men quickly took up arms."

Often the verb can be part of the topic, as in the following example. The new information, or focus, is the person who followed and the number of ships he brought:

"Following him came the quaestor Marcius Rufus with twelve ships."

Penultimate focus
A very frequent place for the focus, however, is in penultimate position, just before the verb or another element. In the example below, Alba has been mentioned in the previous sentence, and the fact that cities have rulers can be assumed; the new information or focus is the name of the ruler at that time, Gaius Cluilius. In this sentence, as in the previous example, the verb itself acts as a topic:

"The ruler of Alba at that time was Gaius Cluilius."

In the following example the fact that northerly regions have winters is already known, and the new information is the fact that they come early:
.
"In this region, winters are early"

In the following, the fire has already been mentioned; the new information is that it continued day and night, with the main emphasis on the fact that it was continuous:

"The blaze was continuous by night and day."

In the following, the fact that the road has been measured can be assumed (Cicero has just mentioned the measurement); the new information is that he measured it himself:
.
"For I measured it myself."

Similarly in the following, the fact that orders were given has already been mentioned, and the fact that they were carried out can be assumed; the new information is that they were carried out quickly:

"They carried out his instructions quickly."

In the following, the sentence answers the unspoken question "What did the general do with all the money he found in the captured city?", the answer being "He sent it to Rome" (with "Rome" being the most important word):

"He sent all the money to Rome."

Initial focus
Occasionally, the focus can be given extra emphasis by being placed before the topic. In the following pair of sentences, the focus of one is at the beginning, and of the other at the end:

"My mother was Samian; (but at that time) she was living in Rhodes."

In the sentence below from Livy, the sentence topic ("that year") and discourse topic ("the war") are in the middle of the sentence. The fact that war was waged on both land and sea is a weak focus placed in penultimate position; but the new and surprising information is that the number of Roman legions was no fewer than 23, and this comes at the beginning of the sentence before the topic:

"That year war was waged on land and sea with (no fewer than) 23 Roman legions."

Emphatic topics
In the following sentence with antithesis, two topics, "the land journey" and "the journey by sea", are contrasted. Because they are contrasted, the topics are more emphatic than the focus:

"The journey there by land is short, and the sea journey from Naupactus is also short."

Similar is the following, where the contrasted topics are "when I was a young man" and "now that I am an old one":

"I defended the republic as a young man, I shall not desert her as an old one."

Devine and Stephens refer to such emphatic topics used contrastively as "co-focus".

Another example is the following, where the phrase "this place" (namely the city of Laurentum which was mentioned in the previous sentence) is in the emphatic penultimate position, as though it were the focus:
.
"The name Troy is also give to this place."

No recordings exist of Latin from the classical period, but it can be assumed that differences in emphasis in Latin were shown by intonation as well as by word order.

Euphony and rhythm

Euphony and rhythm undoubtedly played a large part in Roman writers' choice of word order, especially in oratory, but also in historians such as Livy. Statements from the writers themselves make it clear that the important consideration was the clausula or rhythm of the final few syllables of each clause.

Cicero himself, commenting on a speech of the tribune Gaius Carbo, quotes the sentence below, which apparently caused the audience to burst into shouts of approval:

"The wise words of the father have been proved by the rash behaviour of his son."

In another passage from the same work, Cicero criticises a sentence from the orator Crassus on the grounds that it sounds like a line of iambic poetry.

The 1st-century A.D. teacher of oratory, Quintilian, remarks that hyperbaton (switching words round) is often used to make a sentence more euphonious. He gives the example of the following sentence from the opening of Cicero's :
.
"I noticed, judges, that accuser's speech is divided into two parts."

Quintilian says that  would be correct, but "harsh and inelegant".

In another place he says that to end a sentence with the verb is best, because the verb is the most forceful part of the sentence; but if putting a verb finally is rhythmically harsh, the verb is frequently moved.

Another example where euphonic considerations may have played a part in word order is the following, from a letter by Pliny the Younger:

"It is a big crop of poets this year has brought."

Since  was pronounced , the unusual order with the demonstrative following the noun produces a favourite double cretic clausula (– u – – u –). There is also a pleasing assonance of the vowels a-u-i a-u-i in the last three words.

Individual style
Another factor affecting word order was the individual style of different authors. Devine and Stephens note for example that Livy is fond of putting the object after the verb at the end of the clause (e.g.

Other differences between authors have been observed. For example, Caesar frequently places a number after a noun (in about 46% of cases), but this is rarer in Cicero (only 10% of cases).

Verb position
Several scholars have examined Latin sentences from a syntactic point of view, in particular the position of the verb.

Final verb
In sentences with Subject, Object, and Verb, any order is possible. However, some orders are more common than others. In a sample of 568 sentences of Caesar containing all three elements examined by Pinkster, the proportions were:
SOV : 63%
OSV : 21%
OVS : 6%
VOS : 5%
SVO : 4%
VSO : 1%

An example of the typical Subject-Object-Verb (SOV) word order in Caesar is:

"Caesar withdrew his forces to the nearest hill."

A dependent infinitive, such as  "to be killed" below, also in Caesar usually precedes its verb:

"He ordered the majority of them to be killed."

However, in other genres of Latin, especially more colloquial types such as the comic dialogues of Plautus, Cicero's letters, or Petronius's satiric novel, the final position for the verb is much less common. Marouzeau comments: "In certain texts the medial position of the verb seems more normal than the final."

Linde (1923) counted the verb final clauses in various texts and produced the following figures for clauses with verbs in the final position:

In all authors, the verb tends to be final more often in subordinate clauses than in main clauses.

Over the centuries, verb-final main clauses became less common. In the writing of Egeria (Aetheria) of about A.D. 380, only 25% of main clauses and 37% of subordinate clauses are verb-final.

The verb  "I am" (or its parts) is an exception to the rule that verbs tend to come at the end of the sentence in Caesar and Cicero. With other verbs, the figure is 90%.

In Cicero the verb  is used at the end of a sentence slightly more often, in 20%–35% of main clauses. However, this is less than with other verbs, for which the figure is 55%–70%.

The above figures apply to sentences where  is used as in independent verb (e.g.  "it is difficult"), rather than as an auxiliary to another verb (e.g.  "he set out"), when it frequently ends the clause.

Different authors have different preferences. In Sallust, who has a rather conservative style, the verb  (except where existential) tends to go at the end of the sentence. Cato also usually puts the verb  finally, except in specificational and identity sentences, such as the following:
.
"The following will be the duties of the farm-manager."

Penultimate verb
Quite commonly, especially in certain authors such as Nepos and Livy, the verb can come in penultimate position, followed by the object, as in this example:
 (Livy)
"Popilius with a stick which he was holding in his hand drew a circle round the king."

This stylistic feature, consisting of Verb + Object at the end of a clause, is referred to by Devine and Stephens as "V-bar syntax". It is much less common in Caesar than in Livy.

Even in Caesar, however, a locative phrase may occasionally follow a verb of motion, especially when the locative is focussed:
.
"Pompey from Luceria departed for Canusium."

Other prepositional phrases can also sometimes follow the verb:

"He set off for that place with the legions."

Other types of phrases which can sometimes follow a verb are relative clauses:

"Thinking the same as he had felt before."

Dependent clauses with  almost always follow the verb:

"He orders the Ubii to bring in their cattle."

Another kind of situation where the verb commonly comes in penultimate position is when it is followed by a strongly focussed negative pronoun such as  "no one" or  "anyone":
.
"Which had never happened to anyone before."

"No buyer at all was found."

The grammatical subject can come after the verb in sentences of the following kind where it is focussed, and the verb itself forms part of the topic:

"The original inhabitants of Africa were the Gaetulians and Libyans."

Similarly in sentences such as the following, it is reasonable to suppose that the object is focussed:

"The person I have put in charge of the province is Caelius."

This type of sentence where the focus is on the object at the end should be distinguished from sentences with V-bar syntax such as  "he drew a circle round the king" mentioned above, in which the object is not focussed.

Initial verb

Sudden actions
Initial verbs are often used in sentences such as the following, which describe a sudden or immediate consequence of a previous event:

"The tribunes immediately fled the city."

"He sees the enemy threatening ... he immediately seizes weapons from those next to him ..."

.
"While we were reading the labels carefully, Trimalchio suddenly clapped his hands."

"There was an immediate shout from husband and father!"

Such sentences are of a type known as "thetic" sentences, which answer "What happened?" rather than "What did the subject do?" Frequently they are in the historic present tense (in Caesar the historic present is six times as common in verb-initial sentences as the perfect tense).

Sometimes, even if the verb does not come at the beginning of the sentence, the suddenness of the action can be shown by placing it earlier in its clause.
.
"Immediately several people with weapons make a (sudden) attack on him (my client) from higher ground."

Agentless verbs
The agent of the verb in thetic sentences tends to be less important than the verb; consequently, verb-initial sentences often have a verb in the passive voice.
.
"The matter was reported to Caesar."

.
"There was fierce fighting on both sides."

"They entered an ancient forest."

Intransitive verbs of the type called unaccusative verbs, that is, verbs which have no voluntary agent, such as  "remain",  "grow",  "stand",  "be open",  "flow or spread", also often begin thetic sentences:

"A rumour spread all over the city."

"A great slaughter took place."

Situations
Thetic sentences with initial verb can also be explanatory or give background information:
.
"For Pharnaces had sent a golden crown."

.
"Meanwhile the city was growing."

"(The situation was that) he had betrothed his daughter to the former tribune Lucius Icilius, an active man..."

Presentational verbs
Presentational verbs (e.g.  "there was") are also usually sentence-initial:
.
"There was a hill on the north side."

.
"There had come to him a certain Laetilius."

.
"There remained one other line of route, through the Sequani"

The kind of verbs that typically present new information in this way are such verbs as "there was", "there occurred", "there came".

Emphatic verb
A verb at the beginning of the sentence is often emphatic, perhaps expressing something surprising:

"Panaetius praises Africanus...; why should he not praise him?"

Another situation favouring initial verb position is where the verb is in contrastive focus (antithesis), as in the following:

"For the tree was cut down, not uprooted."

The verbs also come initially in sentences like the one below, in which there is a double antithesis. These are examples of sentences with initial focus (see above):

.
"You scorned Lucius Murena's family and you exalted your own."

Another reason for using a sentence-initial verb is when the speaker is emphatically asserting the truth of a fact:

"Do you dare deny it? ... You were therefore at Laeca's house that night, Catiline!"

.
"It will come, that time will certainly come."

.
"(With my own eyes) I saw, together with the Roman people, the forum and comitium adorned..."

.
"For without doubt, the house of a legal expert is (like) an oracle of the whole city."

Verbs with meanings such as "move", "offend", "make anxious" etc., known as "psych" verbs, also often come sentence-initially. In Livy, the verb  ("moved") frequently (although not always) comes first if it is used in the metaphorical sense:

"The king's speech persuaded the ambassadors to a certain extent."

But when the sense is literal, it always come finally:

"He moved camp from Thermopylae to Heraclea."

Verb as topic
Another reason for putting the verb first is that it represents the topic of the sentence, while the grammatical subject which follows it is the focus. For example, after mentioning that he has been upset by the death of someone, Pliny goes on to say:
.
"The person who died was Corellius Rufus."

Other examples of this are given above in the section on topic and focus.

Questions and imperatives
An initial verb can also be used (without emphasis) in yes-no questions:

"Is my brother inside?"

Imperatives also often (but not always) come at the beginning of a sentence:

"Give me a thousand kisses, then a hundred!"

The verb "to be"
The verb  ("I am") can be used as an auxiliary verb (e.g.  "he was killed"), as a copula (e.g.  "he was rich") or as an existential verb, specifying the existence of something.

Existential
As an existential verb,  (or its past tense ) often goes at the beginning of the sentence. These sentences are also called "presentative" sentences, that is, sentences which serve to introduce new entities into the discourse.
.
"On the north side, there was a hill."

.
"There was a valley between the two armies."

Of these two orders, the first (with the locative phrase between the verb and the noun) is by far the most common. The second example above is unusual in that it does not present new information but merely reminds the reader of what has already been said ("There was a valley, as mentioned above...").

In other sentences, the verb  or  follows the word which it is presenting, or comes in the middle of a phrase in hyperbaton:
.
"There is a river called the Arar, which flows into the Rhone."

.
"On that river there was a bridge."

"There was a marsh, not particularly large, between our army and the enemies' one."

"In their country there are large iron-mines."

Location
The verb  can also specify the location of a thing or person and can equally come at the beginning or end of the sentence:
.
"At that time, Antony was in Brundisium." (Focus on Antonius)

.
"Bruttius himself is at present with me in Rome." (Focus on )

Copula
When  is a copula, it tends to be unemphatic and to be placed after a stronger word, or between two strong words:

"Of all these the most warlike are the Belgae."

"whose father was a legate of Caesar"

This strong word which  follows can also be the subject:

"Gaul, considered as a whole, is divided into three parts."

It is also possible for the subject to follow the copula:
.
"Everything was full of fear and mourning."

Or the order may be Adjective, Subject, Copula:

"Although the common people were hostile to the king."

When the sentence is negative, however, the verb  tends to follow  and is often clause-final:
.
"Moreover, this isn't difficult."

Auxiliary
When  is an auxiliary, it normally follows the participle which it is used with:
.
"In the middle of peace-time, he was killed in Rome while returning from dinner."

.
"He immediately departed for Rome."

Sometimes, however, the auxiliary can be placed earlier to follow some significant item of information, such as a quantity phrase or focussed word:

"and a large number of them were killed."

.
"From there Quinctius departed for Corinth."

"I was overcome with greatest joy when I heard that you had been made consul"

(In the same way, in the above example, the word  is emphasised by placing the unemphatic word  after it.)

In subordinate clauses the auxiliary is frequently placed directly after the conjunction or relative pronoun:
.
"to that same place from where they had set out"

But if there is a focus word following the conjunction or relative pronoun, the auxiliary follows that:
.
"which had been tied to anchors"

In a negative sentence, the auxiliary tends to follow the word .  can either precede or follow the participle:
.
"where the work had not been completed".

.
"There didn't seem to Caesar to be any reason for parlaying."

.
"If Pollux still hasn't departed, set him on his way as soon as you can."

"Clodius did not dare go into the election ground."

Adjective position
Some kinds of adjectives are more inclined to follow the noun, others to precede, but "the precise factors conditioning the variation are not immediately obvious".

In Caesar and Cicero, it has been found that the majority (60%–80%) of ordinary adjectives, not counting pronominals and numerals, precede their nouns.

Factors affecting adjective position

Semantic
One factor affecting the order is semantic. As a general rule, adjectives which express an inherent property of the noun, such as "gold" in "gold ring", tend to follow it. Where the adjective is more salient or important than the noun, as "Appian" in "Appian Way", it also tends to follow it.

Adjectives which express a subjective evaluation, such as  "serious", on the other hand, usually go before the noun. Adjectives of size and quantity also usually precede (in 91% of examples in Caesar, 83% in Cicero), as do demonstrative adjectives such as  "this" and  "that" (99% in Caesar, 95% in Cicero).

Adjectives where there is a choice between two alternatives, such as "left" or "right", or "preceding" and "following", also tend to go before the noun. However, the opposite order (e.g.  "with left hand", Catullus 12) is also found.

Contrast and focus
Other factors such as focus and contrast may also affect the order. When there is contrastive focus the adjective will precede, even if it is one such as a geographical name which normally follows:

"Is he a good man or a bad one?"

"One in the Faliscan and the other in Vatican territory."

Even when the contrast is not explicit, a strong focus may cause the adjective to come first:
.
"It is the Aurelian Way that he has set out on (not any other)."

On the other hand, an adjective which normally precedes, such as a number, can follow the noun when it is focussed or emphasised:

"No fewer than five ships were burnt out."

Contrast the following, where the emphasis is on :
.
"In addition, two triremes were also sunk."

A descriptivrelative clause can be brought forward in the same way as an adjective. In the following sentence, Caesar says the Gauls outside the defences were in confusion, and those inside the defences equally so. The antithesis puts emphasis on the underlined phrase:

'those of the Gauls who were inside the defences were also thrown into confusion'

Diachronic change
Over time the position of adjectives can be seen changing, for example, between Cato the Elder (2nd century BC) and Columella (1st century AD). Adjectives describing the type of something, such as  "wooden",  "designed for oil" or  "new" always follow the noun in Cato, but can come either before or after in Columella.

In Cato, the adjective  "big" follows its noun in 7 out of 9 examples, e.g.  "big storms", but in Caesar about 95% of examples go before the noun.

Livy uses this antique word order at a dramatic moment in his history when he reports the words of the magistrate announcing the news of the disaster at the battle of Lake Trasimene in 217 BC:

"At last not long before sunset, Marcus Pomponius the praetor announced: 'We have been defeated in a great battle'."

Another adjective which changes over time is  "all". In Cato this word goes before or after the noun with equal frequency, but in Cicero's speeches 80% of the time it precedes, and in Caesar it goes before the noun even more commonly.

Stylistic preferences
As with other aspects of word order, stylistic preferences also play a part in adjective order. For example, the adjective  in its literal sense of "higher" (e.g.  "from a higher place") usually comes after the noun in Cicero and in Caesar, but in Livy the position before the noun is much commoner. Vitruvius and Seneca the Younger also preferred the earlier position.

Commonly used phrases
In certain commonly used phrases, the adjective comes after the noun without variation: 
 
 
"the Republic"

 
"the Roman people"

 
"the chief priest"

 
"immortal gods"

In others, the position after the noun is more common but not fixed. The phrase  "civil war" has the adjective following in about 60% of Cicero's examples.

In other commonly used phrases, the adjective always comes first. These include certain terms of relative position and certain adjectives of time:

 
"the right wing"

 
"the rearmost (part of the) column of soldiers"

 
"yesterday"

 
"the following day"

In other common phrases, such as  "at first light", the adjective usually comes first, but  is also found.

Hyperbaton

Often adjectives are emphasised by separating them from the noun by other words (a technique known as hyperbaton). This is especially true of adjectives of size and quantity, but also superlatives, comparatives, demonstratives, and possessives.

Premodifier hyperbaton
Often the adjective precedes the noun:
.
"He was present at all these battles."

The separation can sometimes be a long one:

"They spoke at great length about the constant loyalty of King Hiero towards the Roman people."

Premodifying adjectives in hyperbaton often have focus or contrastive emphasis. In the following example, "these particular" floods are contrasted with some earlier ones which lasted a shorter time:

"This time the flood waters lasted several days."

Sometimes they are merely brought to the front to emphasise them. So in the following example, the adjective  "bloody" is raised to the beginning of the sentence to highlight it and make it stand out:
.
"Brutus, raising high the bloodstained dagger".

Sometimes both the noun and the adjective are important or focussed:

"Great fear overcame the minds of all of them."

This last sentence is an example of double hyperbaton, since  "everyone's minds" is an example of genitive hyperbaton.

Postmodifier hyperbaton
Hyperbaton is also possible when the adjective follows the noun. Often with postmodifier hyperbaton, the noun is indefinite:
.
"Some very great storms arose."

.
"He obtained an enormous amount of booty."

If the noun is definite, the adjective can be predicative:
.
"He abandoned the fields, leaving them uncultivated."

Sometimes the noun, not the adjective, is focussed, and the adjective is a mere tail, as in the following:
.
"My brother will help you a lot in this, and so will Balbus."

Numbers
Cardinal numbers tend to come before the noun in Cicero (90% of examples), but in Caesar only 54% come before the noun. When following the noun, the numeral is often focussed, as in the following, where the important information is in the number "three":

"Gaul is divided into three parts."

Distributive or  numerals usually precede the noun, both in Cicero and Caesar:
.
"Octavius surrounded the town with five camps."

Ordinals precede the noun in 73% of Caesar's examples.
.
"The fight continued from the seventh hour until evening."

Possessive adjectives

Personal possessives
Possessive adjectives, such as  "my",  "his/their", are fairly evenly distributed (68% preceding in Caesar, 56% in a sample of Cicero speeches). When a possessive follows the noun it is unemphatic:
.
"He spoke with him through his friend Gaius Valerius."

"For how long, Catiline, will you continue to abuse our patience?"

When it is more emphatic, or in contrastive focus, it precedes:
.
"If, in such a great crowd of writers, my own fame is hidden..."

.
"not according to someone else's dictation, but at their own discretion".

However, the possessive adjective preceding the noun is not always emphatic: when it is tucked away between two more emphatic words it is usually unemphatic:
.
"He had set fire to my brother's house."

It is also usual for the possessive to precede the noun when vocative:

"'What is it, my Tertia? Why are you sad?' – 'My father,' she said, 'Persa has died'."

and 
The 3rd person genitive pronouns,  "his" and  "their", tend to precede their noun in Caesar (in 73% of instances). Unlike the possessive adjectives, however, there is often no particular emphasis when they are used before a noun:
.
"when his arrival was learnt about"

With certain nouns, such as  "his brother" or  "his friend", however, the position after the noun is slightly more usual.

Pronominal adjectives
Pronominal adjectives are those which can serve both as pronouns and adjectives, such as  "this",  "another",  "a certain (man)" and so on. These adjectives generally have genitive singular  and dative singular .

The most frequent position for pronominal adjectives is before the noun.

Demonstratives

When it follows a noun in unemphatic position,  can often mean "the aforementioned":
.
"This Gavius of Consa that I am talking about."

.
"this state of freedom of pain (which we are discussing)"

In the same way, when it follows a noun,  can sometimes mean "that famous":

"that famous marble statue of Venus"

But more frequently, even when it means "the aforementioned", and also when it means "this one here",  will precede the noun:
 
"with this news (just mentioned)"

"this Aulus Licinius (whom you see here)"

and 
The pronouns  "another",  "another (of two)",  "any", and  "no", when used adjectivally, precede the noun in most cases (93% in both Caesar and Cicero).

 
"without any hesitation"

"in no way"

"in another place"

 
"that second part of the speech"

Occasionally, however, when emphatic, they may follow:

"Certainly this man would have no hope at all of being saved."

In the following, there is a chiasmus (ABBA order):

.
"Different minds are disposed towards different vices."

and 
The word  "a certain" can either precede or follow its noun: 

"a certain nobleman"

"a certain scribe, by the name of Gnaeus Flavius"

When it is used with a person's name, it always follows, or else goes between forename and surname:

"a certain Epicrates"

"a certain Decimus Verginius"

In such a position it is unemphatic, and the emphasis is on the name.

The other indefinite pronoun,  (the adjectival form of ), similarly can either follow or precede its noun:
.
"From Flamma, even if you can't get everything, at least I should  like you to extort some part of the money."

.
"If not all, at least he should put aside some part of his grief"

Of these two, the phrase  is slightly more common; and the phrase  "somehow or other" is always in that order.

Stacked adjectives
It has been noted that in various languages when more than one adjective precedes a noun, they tend to come in a particular order. In English the order usually given is: Determiner > Number > Opinion > Size > Quality > Age > Shape > Colour > Participle forms > Origin > Material > Type > Purpose (for example, "those two large brown Alsatian guard dogs"). In general an adjective expressing a non-permanent state (such as "hot") will go further from the noun than an adjective of type or material which expresses an inherent property of the object.

In Latin, when adjectives precede, they generally have the same order as in English:  
 
"warm cow urine"

"green pine nuts"

"many handsome people".

When the adjectives follow, the opposite order is usually used:

"a heavy gold dish"

"a cooked hen's egg"

"a famous Greek inscription"

There are some apparent exceptions, however, such as the following, in which the adjective  "luxurious" is placed next to the noun:

 
"no suburban or sea-side luxurious villa"

The demonstrative  "this" normally goes before a number, as in English. However, the reverse order is also possible:

 
"in these three cities"

 
"one of these three things"

When  follows a noun, it goes close to it:
 
"this grandfather of yours/your grandfather here"

 
"this country life"

Adjectives of the same semantic class are usually joined by a conjunction in Latin:

 
"good clear water"

"many great nations"

Quite commonly also, one adjective precedes and another follows, as in:

 
"very learned Asiatic men"

Preposition, adjective, noun
When a preposition, adjective and noun are used together, this order is the most common one (75% of Caesar's examples):

"from a humble position to the highest dignity"

More rarely, a monosyllabic preposition may come between an adjective and noun in hyperbaton:

"for this reason"

"with a great deal of noise and shouting"

The order preposition, noun, adjective is also less common:

"to the war against the Parthians"

Genitive position

Possessive genitive
Just as with adjectives, a genitive such as  "of the enemies" can either precede or follow its head-noun. Overall, however, there is a slight tendency for a genitive to come after a noun in both Caesar and Cicero (57% of examples).

Individual preferences play a part in genitive position. Caesar, on the other hand, seems to prefer  (69% of examples).

Relationship terms
With relationship terms, such as  "wife", the genitive can go either before or after the noun. Often when it follows, the genitive is unemphatic:

 
"the boy's uncle" (referring to a previously mentioned boy).

Often (but not always) when the genitive precedes, it is focussed:

 
"he was a pupil of Roscius".

One noun which almost always has a preceding genitive is  "son/daughter":

"Pericles son of Xanthippus".

Objective genitive
When the genitive is an objective one, e.g.  "hope of victory" or  "the saviour of Asia", it normally follows the noun. However, considerations of focus or emphasis can cause it to precede:

 
"authors of facts, not of fables".

Subjective genitive
Subjective genitives can precede or follow the noun. For example, with  "memory", a subjective genitive usually (but not always) precedes:
 
 
"in people's memory".

However, with  "hope", a subjective genitive usually follows, unless focussed:

 
"Catiline's hope".

If a phrase has both a subjective and objective genitive, the subjective one (whether it comes before or after the noun) will usually precede the objective one:

 
"in everyone's despair of being saved".

Partitive genitive
Partitive genitives usually follow the noun:
. 
"the majority of the soldiers"

.
"a large number of enemies"

However, the genitive can also sometimes precede, especially if it is a topic or sub-topic:

"he sent the majority of the cavalry on ahead"

Adjective, genitive, noun
Another place a genitive is often found is between an adjective and the head-noun, especially when the adjective is an emphatic one such as  "all":

. 
"from all parts of the city"
 
 
"large forces of Gauls"

This also applies when a participle is used instead of an adjective:
  
.
"the forces of the Romans having been led out".

The orders Adjective-Noun-Genitive and Adjective-Genitive-Noun are both common in Caesar and Cicero; but Genitive-Adjective-Noun is infrequent.

Enclitic words

Typical enclitic words
There are certain words that are enclitic: they always follow a stronger word. Examples are  "for",  "however, moreover", and  "indeed", which virtually always come after the first full word of the sentence (not counting prepositions) and are never the first.
.
"for he has set out for Spain"

"for his view of death is the following..."

.
"indeed Quintus Ligarius..."

Other words that require a stronger word on which to lean are  "also" and  "indeed" and can never begin a sentence.

"around the middle of the night"

In the phrase  "not even," the word  generally follows the first word of the emphasised phrase, rather than the whole phrase:

.
"not even the immortal gods"

.
"not even decent people"

Weak pronouns
Personal pronouns such as  "me" and  "to me" can have weak and strong forms in Latin.

"Meanwhile Philotimus has just come and given me a letter from you."

"for this was the surname which Staienus had chosen for himself"

.
"He considered that two inheritances had come to him."

Contrast sentences like the following have the indirect object being a full noun and following the direct object (which Devine and Stephens consider to be the neutral word order):
.
"because they had given hostages to the Larisaeans"

Unlike true enclitics, however, pronouns can also sometimes begin a sentence:
.
"I wrote back to him at once."

As with the copula  (see above), when a focus phrase or emphatic delayed topic phrase intervenes, the weak pronoun will usually follow it, rather than the first word of the sentence:
.
"Anger assumes for itself a different tone of voice."

However, the pronoun is sometimes found in second position, and  then follows the focussed phrase:

"Now what remains of my speech is that third topic."

In the following example, the pronoun follows not the focused word but the conjunction  "if":
.
"If your father were saying this to you..."

A functionalist, on the other hand, would say that  naturally comes first as the topic, then  in its normal place, then the unemphatic pronoun, without anything being moved.

See also
Hyperbaton
Clausula (rhetoric)

Bibliography
Adams, James (1976). "A typological approach to Latin word order". Indogermanische Forschungen 81: 70–100. 
Clackson, J.P. and Horrocks, G. (2007) The Blackwell History of the Latin Language, Oxford: Blackwell. S.v. “word order”.
Cunningham, Maurice P. (1957). "Some Phonetic Aspects of Word Order Patterns in Latin". Proceedings of the American Philosophical Society, Vol. 101, No. 5, pp. 481–505.
D&S = Devine, Andrew M. & Laurence D. Stephens (2006), Latin Word Order. Structured Meaning and Information. Oxford: Oxford University Press. Pp. xii, 639. . Google books sample. Reviews by M. Esperanza Torrego, Olga Spevak, and  Anne Mahoney.
Danckaert, Lieven (2011). On the left periphery of Latin embedded clauses. University of Gent PhD thesis.
Danckaert, Lieven (2015). "Studying word order changes in Latin: some methodological remarks". Carlotta Viti. Perspectives on historical syntax, 169, John Benjamins, pp. 233–250, 2015, Studies in Language.
Gildersleeve, B.L. & Gonzalez Lodge (1895). Gildersleeve's Latin Grammar. 3rd Edition. (Macmillan).
Greene, John (1907). "Emphasis in Latin Prose". The School Review, Vol. 15, No. 9 (Nov., 1907), pp. 643–654.
Greene, John (1908a). "How Far Does the Word-Order in Latin Indicate the Proper Emphasis?". The Classical Weekly, Vol. 2, No. 1, pp. 2–4.
Greene, John (1908b). "How Far Does the Word-Order in Latin Indicate the Proper Emphasis?" (Continued). The Classical Weekly, Vol. 2, No. 2, pp. 10–13.
Hopper, Paul J. (1985). Review of Panhuis (1982). Language 61–2, 1985, 466–470.
Linde, P. (1923), "Die Stellung des Verbs in der lateinischen Prosa", Glotta 12.153-178.
Nisbet, R.G.M. (1999). "The Word-Order of Horace's Odes". Proceedings of the British Academy, 93, 135-154.
Panhuis, D.G.J. (1982) The Communicative Perspective in the Sentence: a study of Latin word order, Amsterdam–Philadelphia: John Benjamins. Reviews by Hopper (see above) and J.G.F. Powell.
Pinkster, Harm (1990a), "Evidence for SVO in Latin?", in R. Wright (ed.), Latin and the Romance languages in the early Middle Ages, London, Routledge, 69-82.
Pinkster, Harm (1990b), Latin Syntax and Semantics, chapter 9 "Word Order".
Powell, J.G. (2010) "Hyperbaton and register in Cicero", in E. Dickey and A. Chahoud (eds.), Colloquial and Literary Latin, Cambridge: Cambridge University Press, 163–185.
Rose, H.J. (1924). Review of J. Marouzeau (1922), "L'Ordre des Mots dans la Phrase latine: I. Les Groupes nominaux". The Classical Review, vol. 38, issue 1-2.
Scrivner, Olga B. (2015). A Probabilistic Approach in Historical Linguistics: Word Order Change in Infinitival Clauses: From Latin to Old French. Indiana University PhD Thesis.
Skopeteas, Stavros (2011). Word order in Latin locative constructions: A corpus study in Caesar's De bello gallico. Published online.
Spevak, Olga (2010). Constituent Order in Classical Latin Prose. Studies in Language Companion Series (SLCS) 117. Amsterdam/Philadelphia: John Benjamins Publishing Company, 2010.  Pp. xv, 318.  . Reviews by J.G.F. Powell and James Brookes. (See also K. McDonald, Review of Spevak (2008)).
Spevak, Olga (2014). The Noun Phrase in Classical Latin Prose. Amsterdam studies in classical philology, 21.   Leiden; Boston:  Brill, 2014.  Pp. xiii, 377.  . Review by Patrick McFadden.
Ullman, Berthold L. (1919) "Latin Word-Order". The Classical Journal Vol. 14, No. 7 (Apr., 1919), pp. 404–417.
Walker, Arthur T. (1918) "Some Facts of Latin Word Order". The Classical Journal'', Vol. 13, No. 9, pp. 644–657.

References

External links
University of Chicago Perseus under PhiloLogic searchable corpus. Perseus under PhiloLogic home page
Online version of Allen & Greenough's Latin Grammar
Online version of Gildersleeve & Lodge's Latin Grammar

Latin grammar
Latin-language literature
Word order
Connotation
Historical linguistics
Unsolved problems in linguistics